Selenoprotein W is a protein that in humans is encoded by the SEPW1 gene.

Function 

This gene encodes a selenoprotein, which contains a selenocysteine (Sec) residue at its active site. The selenocysteine is encoded by the UGA codon that normally signals translation termination. The 3' UTR of selenoprotein genes have a common stem-loop structure, the sec insertion sequence (SECIS), that is necessary for the recognition of UGA as a Sec codon rather than as a stop signal. This protein shows highest expression in skeletal muscle and heart, and may be involved in oxidation-reduction reactions. A retroprocessed pseudogene, SEPW1P, has been identified and mapped to chromosome 1p35-34.

References

Further reading

External links 
 

Selenoproteins